The Norway House North Stars are a junior "B" ice hockey team based in Norway House, Manitoba. They are members of the Keystone Junior Hockey League (KJHL).

History 
The franchise was founded in 1991 and competed in the Northwest Junior Hockey League. The North Stars captured eight (1992, 1993, 1994, 1996, 1997, 2000, 2001, 2004) NJHL championships in 13 seasons of the league before joining the KJHL for the 2004–05 season.

Brady Keeper played one season (2012–13) with the North Stars as a 16-year old. Keeper would advance to play three seasons with the OCN Blizzard then two seasons at the University of Maine. On March 18, 2019 Keeper signed an entry-level contract with the Florida Panthers.

Season-by-season record

Note: GP = Games played, W = Wins, L = Losses, T = Ties, OTL = Overtime Losses, Pts = Points, GF = Goals for, GA = Goals against

* = forfeited series after refusing to play home games at a neutral site

Keystone Cup
Western Canadian Jr. B Championships (Northern Ontario to British Columbia)Six teams in round-robin play. 1st vs. 2nd for gold/silver & 3rd vs. 4th for bronze.

References

External links
Norway House North Stars

Ice hockey teams in Manitoba